Nazar Ashraf (born 2 November 1953) is a former Iraq national player and coach, who was the assistant coach of Iraq. He also competed in the men's tournament at the 1980 Summer Olympics. where Iraq finished equal 5th.

Career statistics

International goals
Scores and results list Iraq's goal tally first.

References

External links
 Koora profile 
 Profile 
 Nazar Ashraf at the 1980 Olympics

1953 births
Living people
Iraqi footballers
Iraqi expatriate footballers
Iraqi football managers
Olympic footballers of Iraq
Footballers at the 1980 Summer Olympics
Association football forwards
Al-Quwa Al-Jawiya managers
Al-Ramtha SC managers
Iraq international footballers